The Hyundai Clix was a concept car made by the Hyundai Motor Company in 2001. It was unveiled at the Frankfurt Motor Show in 2001. It has characteristics of both a coupe and a pickup SUV. It had a completely transparent, collapsible roof which allowed it to be configured in a number of ways for different situations.   

 

Clix